Zev Shapiro (born Zev Dickstein) is a student activist and social entrepreneur based in Cambridge, MA in the USA.

Shapiro was born and raised in Cambridge, Massachusetts.  He graduated from Cambridge Rindge and Latin School and currently attends Harvard University.

Shapiro acted as campaign manager for unsuccessful candidate Joyce Gerber in the 2013 Cambridge School Committee elections, at the age of eleven. He has volunteered for the campaigns of Democratic politicians Elizabeth Warren, Ed Markey and Maura Healey. In 2014, he was invited to the State of the Union as Elizabeth Warren’s guest. In 2018, Shapiro spoke in support of a Massachusetts Civics Education Bill.
In 2019, Shapiro launched Turnout, an app that attempted to improve youth voter turnout.

References 

Cambridge Rindge and Latin School alumni
People from Cambridge, Massachusetts
Living people
Year of birth missing (living people)